A list of works by or about the author Lionel Shriver.

Novels
The Female of the Species (1987)
Checker and the Derailleurs (1988)
The Bleeding Heart (1990)
Ordinary Decent Criminals (1992)
Game Control (1994)
A Perfectly Good Family (1996)
Double Fault (1997)
We Need to Talk About Kevin (2003)
The Post-Birthday World (2007)
So Much for That (2010)
The New Republic (2012)
Big Brother: A Novel (2013)
The Mandibles (2016)
The Standing Chandelier (2017)
Property (2018)
The Motion of the Body Through Space (2020)
Should We Stay or Should We Go (2021)

Short fiction 
Collections
Property – Stories Between Two Novellas, 2018 collection
Stories

Non-fiction 
 Abominations: Selected Essays from a Career of Courting Self-Destruction (2022)

Critical studies and reviews of Shriver's work

Notes

Bibliographies by writer
Bibliographies of American writers